Farang is a Persian word that originally referred to the Franks (the major Germanic tribe) and later came to refer to White Europeans in general. The word "Farang" is a cognate and originates from Old French: "".

During the crusades, Frankish control was extended further in the Middle East. Unlike previous Franks, these Franks were almost all Christian as opposed to older Franks who were mixed groups of different religions.

Over time, the word began to be used more generically. In 12th century, the term Frank became associated with all of Western Europeans (including the French, Italians, and the Flemish) in the Muslim world. The term Frangistan was used by Thai and Muslims and was also used frequently by Persians. Muslim traders referred to all European traders as Farang and it entered much of the languages of South Asia and Southeast Asia as a term.

Name

The word farang is from Persian word farang or farangī, refers to Franks, the major Germanic tribe ruling Western Europe. Frangistan was a term used by Muslims and Persians in particular, during the Middle Ages and later periods, to refer to Western or Latin Europe. According to Rashid od-Din Fazl ol-Lāh-e Hamadāni, Arabic word Afranj comes from the Persian farang. This seems unlikely though, considering that the Arabic 'al-Faranj' or 'Afranj' has been attested since the 9th century, in the works of al-Jahiz and Ya'qubi, a century before 'Farang' was first used in an anonymous late 10th century Persian geography book, suggesting that the Persian 'Farang' is a loan from Arabic. By the 11th cetury, Arabic texts were increasingly using the term 'Faransa' or 'al-Faransiyah', already attested in the work of Said al-Andalusi in the mid 11th century.

In the languages of Ethiopia and Eritrea, faranj or ferenj in most contexts still means distant foreigner (generally used to describe Europeans or European descendant/white people), in certain contexts within the Ethiopian and Eritrean diaspora, the term faranj or ferenj has taken on a slightly alternative meaning that closely resembles the term Westerner or Westernized people even though it still mostly applies to European descendants/White People, it can be applied to African Americans and other Westernized People of Color. During the Muslim Mughal Empire when the Europeans arrived in South Asia, the Persian word Farang was used to refer to foreigners of European descent. The words also added to local languages such as Hindi as firangi (Devanāgarī: फिरंगी) and Bengali as firingi (ফিরিঙ্গি). The word was pronounced paranki (പറങ്കി) in Malayalam, parangiar in Tamil, entered Khmer as barang, and Malay as ferenggi. From there the term spread into China as folangji (佛郎機), which was used to refer to the Portuguese and their breech-loading swivel guns when they first arrived in China.

Other uses

South Asia
In Bangladesh and West Bengal, the modern meaning of firingi (ফিরিঙ্গি) refers to Anglo-Bengalis or Bengalis with European ancestry. Most firingis tend to be Bengali Christians. Descendants of firingis which married local Bengali women may also be referred to as Kalo Firingis (Black firingis) or Matio Firingis (Earth-coloured firingis). Following the Portuguese settlement in Chittagong, the Portuguese fort and naval base came to be known as Firingi Bandar or the Foreigner's Port. There are also places such as Firingi Bazaar which exist in older parts of Dhaka and Chittagong. The descendants of these Portuguese traders in Chittagong continue to be referred to as Firingis. The Indian biographical film Antony Firingee was very popular in the mid-20th century and was based on Anthony Firingee – a Bengali folk singer of Portuguese origin. There is also a river in the Sundarbans called Firingi River.

In the Maldives faranji was the term used to refer to foreigners of European origin, especially the French. Until recently the lane next to the Bastion in the northern shore of Malé was called Faranji Kalō Gōlhi.

Southeast Asia
The Royal Institute Dictionary 2011, the official dictionary of Thai words, defines the word as "a person of white race". The term is also blended into everyday terms meaning "of/from the white race" such as: man farang ("farang yam") meaning potato, no mai farang ("farang shoot") meaning asparagus, and achan farang ("farang professor") which is the nickname of the influential figure in Thai art history, Italian art professor Silpa Bhirasri.

Edmund Roberts, US envoy in 1833, defined the term as "Frank (or European)". Black people are called farang dam ('black farang') to distinguish them from whites. This began during the Vietnam War, when the United States military maintained bases in Thailand. The practice continues in present-day Bangkok.

Farang is also the Thai word for the guava fruit, introduced by Portuguese traders over 400 years ago.

Farang khi nok, also used in Lao, is slang commonly used as an insult to a person of white race, equivalent to white trash, as khi means feces and nok means bird, referring to the white color of bird-droppings. Cest Farang are particularly for insult French ethnicity, which swap position from Français, Cest means fragments.

Varieties of food/produce that were introduced by Europeans are often called farang varieties. Hence, potatoes are man farang, whereas man alone can be any tuber; culantro is called phak chi farang (literally farang cilantro/coriander); and chewing gum is mak farang. Mak is Thai for arecanut; chewing mak together with betel leaves (baiphlu) was a Thai custom.

In the Isan Lao dialect, the guava is called mak sida, mak being a prefix for fruit names. Thus bak sida, bak being a prefix when calling males, refers jokingly to a Westerner, by analogy to the Thai language where farang can mean both guava and Westerner.

See also

References

Further reading
 
 
 Kitiarsa, P. (2011). An ambiguous intimacy: Farang as Siamese occidentalism. In R. V. Harrison & P. A. Jackson (Eds.), The ambiguous allure of the West: Traces of the colonial in Thailand (pp. 57–74). Hong Kong Univ. Press; Silkworm Books.

External links

 Farang in the Concise Oxford Dictionary
 German language bi-monthly magazine, published by Der Farang, Pattaya, Thailand
 The Thai word "Farang", its variations in other languages, and its Arabic origin

Ethno-cultural designations
Thai words and phrases
Exonyms
Persian words and phrases